The Lowveld National Botanical Garden, one of the nine National Botanical Gardens of South Africa is located just outside Mbombela, Mpumalanga at the confluence of the Crocodile River and Nels River, which are separated by an extensive promontory. A lookout point at the far end of the garden, reached through a rainforest trail (surrounded by clivias, fig trees, and baobab) allows views of the river in the deep gorge. The N4 road runs through the northern portion of the park.

This garden of 160 ha was opened in 1971. 600 native and 2,000 imported plant species grow there. Almost 650 native tree species are found there as well. The largest collection of cycads in the country is found in Lowveld, as well as a gene bank for such plants.

Gallery

See also 
List of botanical gardens in South Africa

External links 

 South African National Biodiversity Institute
 Lowveld National Botanical Garden Homepage

References 

Botanical gardens in South Africa